Noachis Terra (lit. "Land of Noah") is an extensive southern landmass (terra) of the planet Mars. It is in the Noachis quadrangle.

The term "Noachian epoch" is derived from this region.

Gallery

Gullies on dunes
Gullies are found on some dunes.  These are somewhat different from gullies in other places, like the walls of craters.  Gullies on dunes seem to keep the same width for a long distance and often just end with a pit, instead of an apron. Many of these gullies are found on dunes in the Russel crater.

Interactive Mars map

Further reading
 Lorenz, R.  2014.  The Dune Whisperers.  The Planetary Report: 34, 1, 8-14
 Lorenz, R., J. Zimbelman.  2014.  Dune Worlds:  How Windblown Sand Shapes Planetary Landscapes. Springer Praxis Books / Geophysical Sciences.
 Ruj, T., Komatsu, G., Dohm, J.M., Miyamoto, H. and Salese, F., 2017. Generic identification and classification of morphostructures in the Noachis-Sabaea region, southern highlands of Mars. Journal of Maps, 13(2), pp. 755–766. DOI: 10.1080/17445647.2017.1379913.
 Ruj, T., Komatsu, G., Pasckert, J.H. and Dohm, J.M., 2018. Timings of early crustal activity in southern highlands of Mars: Periods of crustal stretching and shortening. Geoscience Frontiers.

External links
  ESA Science and Technology: Noachis Terra

 
Noachis quadrangle